Peter Johnstone  (born 30 July 1944) was the governor of Anguilla from 4 February 2000 until 29 July 2004.

References

External links
World Statesmen – Anguilla

1944 births
Living people
Governors of Anguilla
Companions of the Order of St Michael and St George